RTO may refer to:

Organisations
 The Really Terrible Orchestra, a British amateur orchestra
 Regional Transport Office, Indian government bureau
 Regional transmission organization, in electric utility distribution
 Registered training organisation
 NATO Research and Technology Organisation, a division of the North Atlantic Treaty Organisation (NATO)
 Russian theatrical society, which was formed in the 19th century

Other
 Return to office, a requirement set by an executive compelling workers to gather in the office during the COVID-19 pandemic
 Recovery time objective, the time for a business process to be restored after a disruption
 referred-to-output
 Rejected takeoff, in aviation
 Regenerative thermal oxidizer, in off-gas treatment
 Retransmission timeout, in the Transmission Control Protocol
 Reverse takeover, a merger between a public company and a private company
 Rent-to-own a piece of property
 Radiotelephone operator, a former occupational specialty in the U.S. military
 Request time out, a packet loss on ping (networking utility)